Porcupine Lake is a 2017 Canadian drama film directed by Ingrid Veninger. It was screened in the Contemporary World Cinema section at the 2017 Toronto International Film Festival. The film had received positive reviews from The Film Stage and Film Threat.

Cast
Delphine Roussel as Ally
Christopher Bolton as Scotty
Lucinda Armstrong Hall as Kate
Maxime Robin as Emile
Charlotte Salisbury as Bea
Harrison Tanner as Romeo

References

External links

2017 films
2017 drama films
2010s coming-of-age drama films
2017 LGBT-related films
Canadian coming-of-age drama films
English-language Canadian films
Canadian LGBT-related films
Films directed by Ingrid Veninger
Lesbian-related films
LGBT-related coming-of-age films
2010s English-language films
2010s Canadian films